Thomas Thomson may refer to:

 Tom Thomson (1877–1917), Canadian painter
 Thomas Thomson (apothecary) (died 1572), Scottish apothecary
 Thomas Thomson (advocate) (1768–1852), Scottish lawyer
 Thomas Thomson (botanist) (1817–1878), Scottish botanist
 Thomas Thomson (chemist) (1773–1852), Scottish chemist
 Thomas Inkerman Thomson (1855–1919), hardware merchant and political figure in Ontario, Canada
 Thomas Napier Thomson (1798–1869), Scottish minister and writer

See also
 Tom Thomson (judoka) (born 1947), Canadian judoka and head coach of the Canadian Paralympic judo team
 Tom Thomson (Canadian football), Canadian football player
 Earl Thomson (1895–1971), Canadian-American Olympic champion hurdler, known as Tommy Thomson
 Thomas Thompson (disambiguation)